Collective choice may refer to:

Social choice
Collective action